Saint Nestor, also known as Saint Nestor of Perge or Hieromartyr Nestor of Magydos, was Bishop of Magydos in Pamphylia, in what is now modern Turkey.

Background
Little is known about Nestor. His courage and authority were so noteworthy that a Roman magistrate uttered these words: "Until we have got the better of the bishop, we shall be powerless against the Christians." During the persecutions under Emperor Decius, Bishop Nestor was arrested while praying in his home.

He was sentenced to death by the local Roman governor, Pollio or Epolius of Lycia, after refusing to sacrifice to the pagan gods of the state. His feast day is February 25 in the Roman Catholic Church and February 28 in the Eastern Orthodox Church.

References

External links
Index of Roman Catholic Saints
St. Nestor
Hieromartyr Nestor the Bishop of Magydos in Pamphylia Orthodox icon and synaxarion

3rd-century deaths
Saints from Roman Anatolia
3rd-century Christian saints
Year of birth unknown
3rd-century bishops in Roman Anatolia